Leeds—Grenville—Thousand Islands and Rideau Lakes is a federal electoral district in Ontario, Canada, that has been represented in the House of Commons since 1979. Prior to the 2015 election, the riding was known as Leeds—Grenville.

The 2018 Leeds—Grenville—Thousand Islands and Rideau Lakes federal by-election was won by Michael Barrett.

Geography
The riding consists of the entirety of the United Counties of Leeds and Grenville.

Demographics
According to the Canada 2016 Census

Ethnic groups: 94.4% White, 3.5% Indigenous
Languages: 93.0% English, 3.7% French 
Religions (2011): 76.2% Christian (23.9% Catholic, 19.3% United Church, 15.0% Anglican, 4.0% Presbyterian, 1.5% Baptist, 10.9% Other), 22.6% None
Median income: $34,329 (2015) 
Average income: $42,939 (2015)

History

The federal district was created in 1976 from parts of Grenville–Carleton and Leeds ridings.

It was initially defined as consisting of the County of Grenville and the County of Leeds, excluding the Town of Smiths Falls. Since 1987, it was re-defined as consisting of the United Counties of Leeds and Grenville, but this did not result in any boundary changes, as Smiths Falls is not part of the county. The 2003 redistribution defined the riding as also including the independent municipalities of Brockville, Gananoque and Prescott which are politically separate jurisdictions, but are geographically within the county, and therefore did not result in a boundary change either.

With the 2012 electoral redistribution, this district lost a small portion of territory to Lanark—Frontenac—Kingston, following an annexation of a parcel of land by the Town Smiths Falls. In the process, the riding was renamed Leeds—Grenville—Thousand Islands and Rideau Lakes. At 49 characters, this is the longest riding name in Canada.

Members of Parliament

This riding has elected the following Members of Parliament:

Election results

Note: Conservative vote is compared to the total of the Canadian Alliance vote and Progressive Conservative vote in 2000 election.

Note: Canadian Alliance vote is compared to the Reform vote in 1997 election.

^ Change is from 1980

See also
 List of Canadian federal electoral districts
 Past Canadian electoral districts

References

Notes

External links
Federal riding history from the Library of Parliament
2011 Results from Elections Canada
 Leeds—Grenville profile at CBC News

Brockville
Ontario federal electoral districts